Casey Tebo (born Casey Patrick Thibeault) is an American film director from Boston, Massachusetts. In the fall of 2020, he directed the scifi horror action film Black Friday Starring Bruce Campbell and Devon Sawa. Black Friday received overall positive reviews, it has a 65% Rotten Tomatoes score and was praised by the New York Times, IGN, and various horror websites.  In 2019, he co-produced "Changeland", the directorial debut from Seth Green. His first documentary was an intimate portrait of his frequent collaborator and friend Steven Tyler in 2018's Steven Tyler:Out On A Limb - and in 2016 writing and directing the dark comedy indie thriller "Happy Birthday". Tebo started out with directing live performances for Aerosmith, Mötley Crüe, Judas Priest , Velvet Revolver, Run DMC, Jennifer Hudson and Sarah McLachlan.  He has directed live broadcast segments for Disney/ESPN, NFL, and MTV and specials including VH1's "Fashion Rocks", ABC's "Dick Clark's Rockin' Eve" and Hard Rock Cafe's "London Calling".

Career
A graduate of Apponequet Regional High School who later studied filmmaking at Southern Connecticut State University, and the now closed BFVF in Boston, Tebo was working as a graphic artist and designed some of Aerosmith's official shirts as he was discovered by the band's singer Steven Tyler, who invited him to film one of their upcoming concerts. The footage was eventually approved to be used on the live album Rockin' the Joint, which Tebo edited alongside English music director Dick Carruthers. Tyler was impressed and asked Tebo to become their  road documentarian.

Prior to becoming a director, Tebo was a graphic artist, collaborating with Outkast, Radiohead, Deep Purple, Kid Rock, Slash and Stone Temple Pilots. He's been published in Rolling Stone, Spin, and Playboy.

His first narrative short film entitled "The Captivus 2.0" was released in March 2011, and played at the 2012 Cannes Film Festival the Seattle International Film Festival. The sets and costumes were constructed entirely of recycled materials. The short gained attention online, receiving praise and social media attention from Joss Whedon, Seth Green, Zachary Levi, and producer Adi Shankar.

In 2013 Tebo's first feature film was released, a concert film entitled "Rock For The Rising Sun". The film tells the story of Aerosmith's journey to Japan shortly after the Fukushima Daiichi nuclear disaster of 2011. Tebo knew it would be a hard sell to Sony Music and Aerosmith management as the band was notorious for not releasing long form videos. Tebo shot the documentary footage while on tour with the band, combined with the live performances, and put the film together without telling anyone. He flew to Los Angeles and screened the film for Steven Tyler and Joe Perry, who insisted it immediately be put out for release.

In 2014, Tebo wrote and directed his first narrative feature film entitled Happy Birthday!, released in 2016.

In the spring of 2015 Tebo won an Emmy as a segment director for his work on ESPN2's E: 60 Special "Dream On: Stories of Boston’s Strongest"

Tebo has directed 8 episodes of the TV Series CMT Crossroads:

Randy Travis and The Avett Brothers
Lady Antebellum and Stevie Nicks
The Band Perry and Fall Out Boy
Dierks Bentley and One Republic
Kacey Musgraves and Katy Perry
John Legend and Lee Ann Womack
Bob Seger and Jason Aldean

In the Summer of 2015 Tebo along with film producer Todd Thompson from Cross Creek Pictures, started a new Television production company called Vermilion Entertainment.

Recent Projects
In 2017-2018 Tebo wrote two feature-length scripts, "Mad Bastard" an original story by British writer, Christopher Bell. The film is in production at Millennium Films. In the Spring of 2017, Tebo partnered with Producer Paul Schiff on an original science fiction script "The Carrier" that he wrote.

In 2019 Tebo and Thompson's Vermilion Entertainment secured their first scripted Television show at Universal Cable Productions, a reimagining of Alfred Hitchcock Presents written by Patrick Macmanus.

In 2019 Tebo was credited as a Producer on his friend Seth Green's directorial debut, Changeland, though in press Tebo has said he offered little more than "moral support"

In 2020 Tebo directed a feature documentary on the troubling state of legal Cannabis and CBD industries in the United States entitled "Barely Legal". It was produced by Michael Thompson, the younger brother of Tebo's producing partner Todd Thompson.

In 2020 via Instagram Tebo announced he had signed a contract to direct the Alien invasion thriller "Black Friday" starring Bruce Campbell, Michael Jai White, and Devon Sawa. Filming took place in Boston in the fall/winter of 2020.

Sources 
Variety
Deadline
Fox Boston.
Website
 GeekNation
IMDB

References

External links
 

American music video directors
Living people
1974 births
Southern Connecticut State University alumni